Bulong may refer to:

Places
 Bulong, Western Australia
 Bilung (pinyin as Bulong), Biru County, Tibet, China; a township
 Bulong Town, Baicheng County, Xinjiang, China; a town; see Baicheng County

Culture
 Blang people, also known as Bulong, an ethnic group in China
 Blang language, also known as Bulong

Entertainment
 Bulong (film), a 2011 Philippine film

Music
 Bulong (2019 song), the theme song of the 2019 TV series Hanggang sa Dulo ng Buhay Ko
 Bulong (2018 song), a 2018 song by December Avenue; see December Avenue discography
 Bulong (2004 song), a 2004 song by Kitchie Nadal, off her self-titled album Kitchie Nadal (album)
 Bulong (1992 song), a 1992 song by Janno Gibbs
 Bulong (album), a 1992 album by Janno Gibbs

Other uses
 a type of whispering medical prayer, see History of medicine in the Philippines

See also

 
 
Bolong (disambiguation)